Jebb Fink is an American-Canadian stand-up comedian and television personality, known as a reporter and host for The Big Breakfast on A-Channel Calgary. He won a Gemini as co-creator of the CBC comedy An American in Canada and was a weather presenter on Your City for Citytv Calgary, he also hosted the short-lived late night talk show Global Late Night for the Global Television Network in 2004.

Born and raised in Los Angeles, California, Fink moved to Canada in adulthood after marrying a woman from Edmonton, Alberta. Jebb and his wife moved to Calgary in 1990. His comedy, which is largely based on exploring cultural differences between Canada and the United States, also inspired the CBC Television sitcom An American in Canada.

References

External links
Jebb Fink

1958 births
People from Compton, California
American stand-up comedians
Canadian stand-up comedians
Canadian television talk show hosts
People from Los Angeles
People from Calgary
Living people
American emigrants to Canada
Comedians from California
Comedians from Alberta